Phichunchäni (Aymara phichunchä a brownish-grey bird (ä stands for a long a), -ni a suffix, "the one with the phichunchä bird", also spelled Pichunchani) is a mountain in the Andes of Peru which reaches a height of approximately . It is located in the Arequipa Region, Arequipa Province, Tarucani District. Phichunchäni lies northwest of the Ubinas volcano.

References 

Mountains of Arequipa Region
Mountains of Peru